Flight Sergeant Stanley James Woodbridge,  (29 August 1921 – 7 February 1945), known as Stan Woodbridge, was a British Second World War recipient of the George Cross. He was born in Chelsea, London, and during the Second World War served as a member of the Royal Air Force Volunteer Reserve, with No. 159 Squadron RAF.

Second World War
Woodbridge was captured by Japanese forces along with five other members of his crew, when their Consolidated Liberator aircraft crashed in Burma. The three other members of the crew, including former rugby player Les Adams, were killed. Woodbridge, who was the crew's wireless operator, was subjected to torture, and was eventually beheaded along with the three other non-commissioned officers from his crew. The two commissioned officers from the crew were taken to Rangoon Jail and found alive when Rangoon was liberated. Throughout his ordeal, Woodbridge refused to give information to his Japanese captors about his codes or radio equipment.

In 1948, Woodbridge was posthumously awarded the George Cross in recognition of his courage and devotion to duty.

Woodbridge is buried at the Rangoon War Cemetery.

Notes

References

London Gazette archive
George Cross (GC) Database – Highest civilian gallantry award at www.gc-database.co.uk
GC Holders at www.rafweb.org Stanley James Woodbridge
http://www.airscene.org/monument/GCawards.htm#woodbridge
A BARBAROUS ENEMY at www.rquirk.com Details of the atrocity
GC Awards to Jap POWs at www.stephen-stratford.com

1921 births
1945 deaths
Royal Air Force airmen
Royal Air Force Volunteer Reserve personnel of World War II
British recipients of the George Cross
Royal Air Force recipients of the George Cross
Royal Air Force personnel killed in World War II
English people murdered abroad
Japanese war crimes
People from Chelsea, London
People murdered in Myanmar
People executed by Japan by decapitation
Executed people from London
World War II prisoners of war held by Japan
British World War II prisoners of war
Military personnel from London
1945 murders in Myanmar